This is a list of the books published by Dorling Kindersley, part of Penguin Random House.

This list is incomplete

Visual guides
Popular titles that DK has published include a series of large-format "visual guides".

Non-fiction

Science and nature

Fiction

See also
Booklist
Eyewitness Books

References

External links 
 Dorling Kindersley website
 Dorling Kindersley travel
 Dorling Kindersley personalized travel guides
 
 Official YouTube channel

Book publishing companies of the United Kingdom